The Sonnenstein is a hill in the Eichsfeld, Thuringia, Germany. It forms part of the Ohm Hills.  Its elevation is 486 metres (1,594 ft) above sea level.

Information and pictures

Hills of Thuringia